Sir Joshua Rowe (died 30 October 1874) was Chief Justice of Jamaica from 1832 to c. 1856.

References 

Chief justices of Jamaica
Year of birth missing
1874 deaths
Knights Bachelor
19th-century Jamaican judges